Giuseppe Antonio Pujati (28 May 1701, Sacile, Province of Pordenone - 12 June 1760) was an Italian physician.

He was born in Sacile, a town in Friuli, to a merchant family. He completed early studies under the Jesuits in Venice, and in 1719, graduated with a medical degree from the University of Padua. In Padua, he was to encounter the physicians Bernardino Ramazzini, Antonio Vallisneri, Giovanni Battista Morgagni, and Alessandro Knips Macoppe, who each was adding to the modern understanding of medicine and anatomy. After practicing in Venice, in 1726 he left for the island of Korčula. He began to publish on medical practice.

References

1701 births
1760 deaths
People from Sacile
18th-century Italian physicians